Marc Daubert (born January 13, 1963) is an American musician, He collaborated with Phish for a brief time in their early history.

Daubert was a close friend of guitarist Trey Anastasio. Anastasio, Daubert, and lyricist/keyboardist Tom Marshall recorded a project entitled Bivouac Jaun. Much of this recording would end up on Phish's debut album, known as The White Tape.

When Anastasio returned to UVM in September 1984, he brought Daubert along. The most circulated Phish tape featuring Daubert is from a performance on December 1, 1984, at the club Nectar's in downtown Burlington, Vermont. After a run of shows in February 1985 at a club called Doolin's, Daubert quit the band.

Daubert also penned the lyrics to the Phish song "The Curtain," which was first performed live by Phish in 1987, over two years after Daubert's departure from the band.

Marc Daubert is listed in the album credits on the CD "Lawn Boy" (Elektra Records 1990). He continues to write, produce and copyright music under his own music label Marc Daubert Music.

References

The Phish Companion.  A Guide to the Band and Their Music (2004) Miller Freeman Books, pages 314, 5, 329, 13, 509
Go Phish (2000) St. Martins Press pages 9, 32

Discography
 
1. Parlor Tricks (2006)
2). http://blaqfather.bandcamp.com/
3). { Time Travel Music Genre } References : 
http://blaqfather.bandcamp.com/track/tanx
http://blaqfather.bandcamp.com/track/signals
http://blaqfather.bandcamp.com/track/whisper

External links 
 MarcDaubert.com (archived copy)
 "Former Phish Percussionist Marc Daubert Has No Regrets", interview in Glide Magazine

Phish members
1963 births
Living people
American rock drummers
20th-century American drummers
American male drummers